Ethel May Eliza  Zahel (3 February 1877 – 9 April 1951) was an Australian public servant and schoolteacher who was  born in Mackay, Queensland, Australia. On 6 November 1895 she married Mark Charles Zahel, solicitor, at her parents' home in Mackay. In 1905 she moved to Thursday island with her husband who died there on 4 June 1907. Ethel accepted a permanent appointment to the Torres Strait Islands teaching service dated on 15 June 1909. She moved to the island of Yam with her daughter Ethel Lorenza, who died a few months later.

In October 1909 she opened a school on Badu (Mulgrave Island) and lived in the household of Frederick Walker, a former missionary. In 1915 she was given control of the Papuan Industries Ltd. 'company boats', owned by Islanders and signed authorizations for provisioning the vessels and payments made for pearl-shell and trochus brought back to Badu.

Australia declaration of war with Japan led to her evacuation from the Torres Strait on 29 January 1942 and she then retired from the public service. She died in Brisbane, Queensland, Australia on 9 April 1951.

References

Public servants of Queensland
Australian schoolteachers
Australian Anglicans
Australian people of English descent
1877 births
1951 deaths